Chalthan is a census town in Surat City  in the state of Gujarat, India.

Demographics
 India census, Chalthan had a population of 12,746. Males constitute 57% of the population and females 43%. Chalthan has an average literacy rate of 71%, higher than the national average of 65%; with male literacy of 78% and female literacy of 62%. 14% of the population is under 6 years of age.

Famous

Chalthan is mainly famous for its sugar mill & Mangos

Schools

 Adarsh hindi vidyalaya
 Bhardwaj Public School
 Little flower high school
 Holy cross
 Global international school
 Apex school
 K.V.Mehta Vidhyalaya
 Phoenix k12 school
 Primary school

References

See also 
List of tourist attractions in Surat

Suburban area of Surat
Cities and towns in Surat district